Histone deacetylase 6 is an enzyme that in humans is encoded by the HDAC6 gene. HDAC6 has emerged as a highly promising candidate to selectively inhibit as a therapeutic strategy to combat several types of cancer and neurodegenerative disorders.

Function 

Histones play a critical role in transcriptional regulation, cell cycle progression, and developmental events. Histone acetylation/deacetylation alters chromatin structure and affects transcription. The protein encoded by this gene belongs to class II of the histone deacetylase/acuc/apha family. It contains an internal duplication of two catalytic domains that appear to function independently of each other. This protein possesses histone deacetylase activity and represses transcription.

It retracts the cilium of the cell, which is necessary prior to mitosis.

HDAC encourages cell motility and catalyzes α-tubulin deacetylation. As a result the enzyme encourages cancer cell metastasis.

HDAC6 affects transcription and translation by regulating heat-shock protein 90 (Hsp90).

HDAC6 is required in the formation of stress granule (SG) proteins and is instrumental in SG formation; pharmacological inhibition or genetic removal of HDAC6 abolished SG formation.

HDAC6 bonds with high affinity to ubiquitinated proteins.

HDAC6 is involved in leptin sensitivity.

HDAC6 deacetylates tyrosine residue T178 on TAK1.

Clinical relevance 

Mutations in this gene have been associated to Alzheimer's disease.

Over expression of this protein correlates with tumorigenesis and cell survival. HDAC6 also encourages metastasis of cancer cells. 

Since HDAC6 is dysregulated and/or implicated in several cancers and neurodegenerative disorders, pharmacological inhibition of this specific enzyme holds great therapeutic potential and could also limit side effects associated with pan-inhibitors of multiple HDAC enzymes. Selective inhibition of HDAC6 as a strategy to treat cancers is however also subject of debate, since some HDAC6 inhibitors exhibited anti-tumor activity in vitro and in vivo only when administered in high concentrations, which also produced off-target effects. The findings suggest that further study is needed to clarify data on anti-cancer effects of selective HDAC6 inhibitors.

Interactions 

HDAC6 has been shown to interact with HDAC11 and Zinc finger and BTB domain-containing protein 16.

HDAC6 interacts with SG (Stress granule) protein G3BP1.

See also 
 Histone deacetylase

References

Further reading

External links 
 
 
 

EC 3.5.1